Sarvandan (also Romanized as Sarvandān and Sorvandān; also known as Surbandan) is a village in Sangar Rural District, Sangar District, Rasht County, Gilan Province, Iran. At the 2006 census, its population was 1,898, in 516 families.

References 

Populated places in Rasht County